HKBA may refer to:

Hong Kong Bar Association, a professional regulatory body for barristers in Hong Kong
Hong Kong Broadcasting Authority, a defunct organisation responsible for licensing and regulating the broadcasting industry in Hong Kong
Hong Kong Buddhist Association, a Buddhist umbrella organisation in Hong Kong